Alto Lane (March 4, 1908 – August 13, 1974) was an American baseball pitcher in the Negro leagues. He played with the Memphis Red Sox, Indianapolis ABCs, Kansas City Monarchs, and Cincinnati Tigers from 1929 to 1934.

He also played for the Lexington Heavy Hitters in 1929 and 1930.

References

External links
 and Baseball-Reference Black Baseball stats and Seamheads

Memphis Red Sox players
Indianapolis ABCs (1931–1933) players
Kansas City Monarchs players
Cincinnati Tigers players
1908 births
1974 deaths
Baseball players from Alabama
Baseball pitchers
People from Montgomery, Alabama
20th-century African-American sportspeople